Fahy (Irish: an Fhaiche, meaning "a green field") is a village outside Westport, County Mayo, Ireland. It is the half-parish of Kilmeena. It has a school and a church.

Connacht
County Mayo